Edward N. Szrejter (1927-2020) was a former Executive Director of the United States Judo Association.  He is notable as the creator of the Judo Kata of Renraku-no-kata, which translates to Forms of Combination.

Clubs
Edward Szrejter was the point of contact for the Danang Judo Club. He later ran a club in Florida that had upwards of 230 members.

References

American male judoka
American sports executives and administrators
Sportspeople from Florida
1927 births
2020 deaths